Something About Love may refer to:

Something 'Bout Love, a song by David Archuleta,
Something About Love (film), a Canadian drama film released in 1988.